Steven Wood (17 March 1961 – 23 November 1995) was an Australian sprint and marathon canoeist who competed in the late 1980s and early 1990s. Competing in two Summer Olympics, he won a bronze medal in the K-4 1000 m event at Barcelona in 1992.

Wood won two medals at the ICF Canoe Sprint World Championships with a silver (K-4 1000 m: 1991) and a bronze (K-2 1000 m: 1986).

He was married to Anna Wood, a Dutch-born sprint canoeist who won two bronze medals at the Summer Olympics, one for Australia and one for the Netherlands. He was an Australian Institute of Sport scholarship holder in 1988 and 1991–1992. Wood committed suicide in Brisbane by hanging himself, possibly due to a recurring elbow injury.

References

Sports-reference.com profile

1961 births
1995 suicides
Australian male canoeists
Olympic canoeists of Australia
Olympic bronze medalists for Australia
Olympic medalists in canoeing
Canoeists at the 1988 Summer Olympics
Canoeists at the 1992 Summer Olympics
Medalists at the 1992 Summer Olympics
ICF Canoe Sprint World Championships medalists in kayak
Medalists at the ICF Canoe Marathon World Championships
Australian Institute of Sport canoeists
Suicides by hanging in Australia
Suicides in Queensland
20th-century Australian people